Jason Bennett (born December 2, 1986) is an American basketball player who last played for the Jacksonville Giants of the ABA.

College years
A center, Bennett played in college with the Kansas State Wildcats under Bob Huggins. He holds the record for the most blocks in a game in Kansas State history. After one season, he then transferred to Tallahassee Community College and then to the University of Detroit Mercy.

Professional career
In the 2009 to 2010 season he played basketball overseas for the Neptune Basketball Club in Cork, Ireland.

Jason signed with the Jacksonville Giants in 2010.

External links
Jacksonville Giants Bio
Detroit Titans Bio

1986 births
Living people
American expatriate basketball people in Ireland
American men's basketball players
Basketball players from Jacksonville, Florida
Centers (basketball)
Detroit Mercy Titans men's basketball players
Kansas State Wildcats men's basketball players
Tallahassee Eagles men's basketball players